Lars is a common male name in Scandinavian countries.

Origin
Lars means "from the city of Laurentum". Lars is derived from the Latin name Laurentius, which means "from Laurentum" or "crowned with laurel". 

A homonymous Etruscan name was borne by several Etruscan kings, and later used as a last name by the Roman Lartia family. The etymology of the Etruscan name is unknown.

People
Lars (bishop), 13th-century Archbishop of Uppsala, Sweden
Lars Kristian Abrahamsen (1855–1921), Norwegian politician
Lars Ahlfors (1907–1996), Finnish Fields Medal recipient
Lars Amble (1939–2015), Swedish actor and director
Lars Herminius Aquilinus, ancient Roman consul
Lars Bak (born 1980), Danish road bicycle racer
Lars Bak (computer programmer) (born 1965), Danish computer programmer
Lars Bender (born 1989), German footballer
Lars Christensen (1884–1965), Norwegian shipowner, whaling magnate and philanthropist
Lars Magnus Ericsson (1846–1926), Swedish inventor
Lars Eriksson, several people
Lars Frederiksen (born 1971), American musician
Lars Frölander (born 1974), Swedish swimmer
Lars Eilebrecht (born 1972), German software engineer
Lars Eller (born 1989), Danish ice hockey player
Lars Grael (born 1964), Brazilian sailor
Lars Gullin (1928–1976), Swedish jazz saxophonist
Lars Haglund (born 1940), Swedish discus thrower
Lars Peter Hansen (born 1952), American economist and Nobel laureate 
Lars Hjortsberg (1772–1843), Swedish actor
Lars Holte (born 1966), Norwegian trance producer and DJ
Lars Hörmander (1931–2012), Swedish mathematician and Fields Medal recipient
Lars Isacsson (born 1970), Swedish politician
Lars Iyer (born 1970), British novelist and philosopher
Lars Jansson (cartoonist) (1926–2000), Finnish author and cartoonist
Lars Jansson (composer) (born 1951), Swedish jazz pianist and composer
Lars Jonsson (disambiguation), several people
Lars Kleppich (born 1967), Australian sailor
Lars Knudsen (born 1962), Danish researcher in cryptography
Lars Kragh Andersen (born 1980), Danish activist
Lars Krutak (born 1971), American tattoo anthropologist
Lars Lagerbäck (born 1948), Swedish football manager
Lars Johann Yngve Lannerbäck (born 1963), Swedish musician, better known as Yngwie Malmsteen
Lars Larson (born 1959), American conservative talk radio show host
Lars Leiro (1914–2005), Norwegian politician
Lars Lindberg Christensen (born 1970), Danish astronomer
Lars Lönnroth (born 1935), Swedish literary scholar
Lars-Erik Lövdén (born 1950), Swedish politician
Lars Mikael Åkerfeldt (born 1974), Swedish composer and vocalist of Opeth and Bloodbath
Lars Mikkelsen (born 1964), Danish actor
Lars Nootbaar (born 1997), American baseball player
Lars Onsager (1903–1976), Norwegian chemist and Nobel laureate
Lars Pensjö, creator of the LPMud software, often referred to in the MUD community solely by his first name
Lars Petrus (born 1960), Swedish Rubik's Cube champion
Lars Porsena, Etruscan king of Clusium
Lars Løkke Rasmussen (born 1964), Prime Minister of Denmark, 2009 to 2011 and 2015 to 2019
Lars Kristian Relander (1883–1942), Finnish president
Lars Riedel (born 1967), German discus thrower
Lars Rainer Rüetschi (born 1977), Swiss musician
Lars Saabye Christensen (born 1953), Norwegian author
Lars Skalm (born c. 1430), Finnish noble and mayor of Turku
Lars Spuybroek (born 1959), Dutch architect
Lars Stjernkvist (born 1955), Swedish politician and journalist
Lars Tolumnius (died 437 BC), Etruscan king of Veii
Lars von Trier (born 1956), Danish film director
Lars Ulrich (born 1963), Danish drummer for the heavy metal band Metallica
Lars Unnerstall (born 1990), German footballer
Lars Vilks (1946–2021), Swedish artist
Lars Wegendal (born 1949), Swedish politician

Fictional characters
 Lars, the Go Jetters' expert mechanic.
 Lars, in the Adult Swim television pilot Paid Programming
 Lars, in the 1979 film Scavenger Hunt, played by Arnold Schwarzenegger
 Laramie "Lars" Barriga, a supporting character in the Steven Universe cartoon series
 Lars, in the Star Trek: The Original Series episode The Gamesters of Triskelion
 Lars, the unseen husband of Phyllis Lindstrom in The Mary Tyler Moore Show 
 Lars Alexandersson, in the Tekken series
 Lars Fillmore, in the animated movie Futurama: Bender's Big Score
 Lars Lindstrom, the lead character of the 2007 film Lars and the Real Girl, portrayed by Ryan Gosling
 Lars Rodriguez, in the Rocket Power TV series
 Lars Umlaut, in the Guitar Hero series
 Lars, the main character (a baby polar bear) in the children's book series The Little Polar Bear by Hans de Beer
 Lars, in the 2011 film The Thing, a prequel to the 1982 film of the same name
 Lars, in the 2003 film "101 Dalmatians II: Patch's London Adventure", a German artist
 Lars, a family name in the "Star Wars" film series, a matrimonial branch of the Skywalker family

See also
LARS (disambiguation)
Lasse (disambiguation)
Lassen (disambiguation)
Lares

References

Masculine given names
Estonian masculine given names
Scandinavian masculine given names
Danish masculine given names
Faroese masculine given names
Swedish masculine given names
Norwegian masculine given names
German masculine given names
Dutch masculine given names
Swiss masculine given names